Error 93 is the second studio album by Argentine rapper and singer Cazzu. It was released by surprise on 3 June 2019 by Rimas Entertainment. Error 93 is a trap, hip hop and reggaeton record. It was primarily produced by YTBM and also features production from La Paciencia. The album features guest appearances by Dalex, Lyanno, Rauw Alejandro and trap group Modo Diablo, comprised by Duki, Neo Pistea and Ysy A.

The album gained a nomination for Female Album of the Year at the 2020 Tu Música Urbano Awards.

Background and composition
In Error 93, Cazzu opens up about love, deception, and independence. The singer wrote each one of the ten tracks on her own. According to Billboards Jessica Roiz, "the album establishes her as a well-rounded urban act who can play with trap and hip-hop rhythms, as heard on "Mucha Data", and also drop fiery old-school reggaeton/perreo songs, as heard on "Rally" and "Al Reves"." The first single off of Error 93 was "Visto a las 00:00", a "sensual urban track about starting a relationship from scratch."

As regards the creative process, Cazzu said, "I sat down with my producer and we listened to lots of albums. One of the albums we most listened to was Halsey's Badlands. I love being able to fuse some of the sounds that she uses to create urban music. Jeremih is another artist whose flow and way of singing and composing music I try to incorporate. "I am simply trying to create what is essentially in my brain."

Track listing
All tracks are produced by YTBM, and written by Julieta Cazzucheli, except where noted.

Notes
 "Visto a las 00" is sometimes credited as "00:00"

Charts

References

2019 albums
Spanish-language albums